Akpene Diata Hoggar is a Ghanaian creative entrepreneur, blogger, social activist and a model. In 2018, she represented the Brong-Ahafo Region in the Miss Universe Ghana contest and won, giving her the opportunity to represent Ghana in the same contest at the international level in Bangkok, Thailand.

Early life and education 
Akpene was born and raised in Akatsi in the Volta Region of Ghana. She attended Ashesi University where she studied  Management Information Systems.

Career 

Prior to winning the Miss Universe Ghana contest, she contested in the Model Face of Ghana. She co-founded Creatives Anonymous Gh, a creative career guide for the African youth with her partner Setor Nyendu. She also founded Sundiata Studios, a lifestyle digital agency. Akpene has established Peer Relief, a youth-oriented initiative that seeks to bring mental health awareness to the forefront of national attention. Akpene is also a travel and lifestyle blogger.

Akpene has walked several local and international runway shows as a model including Fashion for Peace Fashion Show at Paris Peace Forum 2018. Akpene believes in empowering the next generation of girls in Africa and her experiences as a woman in Information Technology has led her into her newest project called DSKVRD (Discover Yourself, Discover Your Purpose). The program encourages girls in underprivileged communities to seek self discovery through creativity, storytelling and digital skills.

References

External links 

Living people
Ashesi University alumni
21st-century Ghanaian businesswomen
21st-century Ghanaian businesspeople
Year of birth missing (living people)
Ghanaian female models
Ghanaian beauty pageant winners
Miss Universe Ghana winners
Miss Universe 2018 contestants